Parque Carlos Guerrero is a sports complex in Olavarría, Argentina. Its arena is primarily used for basketball and is home to the Estudiantes de Olavarria. The arena has a capacity of 6,070 people.

References

External links
  

Sports venues in Argentina